Daniele Raffaeli (born 5 April 1977) is an Italian voice actor.

Raffaeli provides the voice of the main protagonist Ben Tennyson in the Italian-language versions of Ben 10, Ben 10: Alien Force, and Ben 10: Ultimate Alien and Ben 10: Omniverse. He also provides the voice of the Chuck Bass in the Italian-language version of the teen drama series Gossip Girl.

Raffaeli was born in Rome. He works at Sefit - CDC, Dubbing Brothers, C.D. Cine Dubbing, and other dubbing studios in Italy.

Dubbing roles

Animation Italian dubbing
 Ben Tennyson and Upgrade in Ben 10
 Ben Tennyson, Albedo, and Swampfire in Ben 10: Alien Force
 Ben Tennyson, 10-year-old Ben, Albedo, Nanomech, Swampfire, and Ultimate Swampfire in Ben 10: Ultimate Alien
 Ben Tennyson in Ben 10: Secret of the Omnitrix
 Gizmo (Second voice) in Teen Titans
 Harold Berman in Hey Arnold!
 Harold Berman in Hey Arnold!: The Movie
 Noboru Terao in Voices of a Distant Star
 Ginta Toramizu in MÄR
 Comet in Space Chimps
 Abnermal in Garfield's Pet Force
 Bobby Hill in King of the Hill
 Natsume Hyuuga in Alice Academy
 Noah Nixon in Generator Rex
 Chad Dickson/Numbuh 274 in Codename: Kids Next Door
 Ace Bunny in Loonatics Unleashed
 Woo the Wise in Hero: 108
 Yamato Delgado in Battle B-Daman
 Benjamin Martin in Spaced Out
 Wade Load (Second voice) in Kim Possible
 Brett in Team Galaxy
 Wade Load in Kim Possible: A Sitch in Time
 Wade Load in Kim Possible Movie: So the Drama
 Chester McBadbat (Seasons 4-5) in The Fairly OddParents
 Dragon in Miss Spider's Sunny Patch Friends
 SwimmyBird and Tuck in Tomodachi Life: The TV Series
 Scamp (Speaking voice) in Lady and the Tramp II: Scamp's Adventure
 Vincent in Flatmania
 Katz Kobayashi in Mobile Suit Zeta Gundam
 Kaytoo in Eliot Kid
 Gene Belcher in Bob's Burgers
 Davey Hunkerhoff in The Replacements
 Max Kirrin in Famous 5: On the Case
 Erik in Di-Gata Defenders
 Myron in Wayside
 Kai in Ninjago
 Macky in Friends and Heroes
 Oburi in A Kite
 Lenny Carrot in VeggieTales
 Shinji Ikari in Neon Genesis Evangelion
 Shinji Ikari in Evangelion: Death and Rebirth
 Shinji Ikari in The End of Evangelion
 Kakeru Sakamaki in Idaten Jump
 Bouncing Boy in Legion of Super Heroes
 Rinpun and Kojin in Magic User's Club
 Amiboshi and Suboshi in Fushigi Yûgi
 Tang in Shaolin Wuzang
 Mookie in Baby Felix
 Nike in Mahōjin Guru Guru
 Nike in Doki Doki Densetsu Mahōjin Guru Guru
 Dortin in Sorcerous Stabber Orphen
 Hokuto Kusanagi in Gear Fighter Dendoh
 Saisuke in Shuriken School
 Jun Aoi in Martian Successor Nadesico
 Masato Iwai in Gals!
 Shinpachi Shimura in Gin Tama
 Edwin "Meat" Kapinski in Sym-Bionic Titan
 Gehl in Wolf's Rain
 Rex in Pop Pixie
 Lightning in Total Drama: Revenge of the Island
 Julio in Spike Team
 Luca in Teen Days
 Kid Flash in Young Justice
 Kanba Takakura and Penguin 1 in Mawaru Penguindrum

Live action Italian dubbing
 Thiago Bedoya Agüero in Casi Ángeles
 Joe Scott (young) in Flashbacks of a Fool
 Chuck Bass in Gossip Girl
 Goku in Dragonball Evolution
 Ukataka in Naruto Shippuden
 Travis Apple in You Wish
 Marco Del Rossi in Degrassi: The Next Generation
 Michael Jordan in Space Jam
 Kimo in Haven
 Max Collins in Vanished
 Tao (Seasons 2-3) in BeastMaster
 Corporal Walt Hasser in Generation Kill
 Mark in Kyle XY
 Ethan Craft in Lizzie McGuire
 Kwan in Thunderstone
 Cyrus in The Ex List
 JB Deekes in The Elephant Princess
 Anthony in Falling Skies
 Ralph Owen in Holly's Heroes
 Russell "Russ" Skinner in Wicked Science
 Spike Bannon in My Spy Family
 Scurvy in The Giblet Boys
 Oliver Martin in Unser Charly
 Charley Prince in Blue Water High
 Timo in Gegen den Wind
 Martin Staunton in Foreign Exchange

References

External links
 

Living people
Male actors from Rome
Italian male voice actors
1977 births